The 1980 Family Circle Cup was a women's tennis tournament played on outdoor clay courts at the Sea Pines Plantation on Hilton Head Island, South Carolina in the United States. The event was part of the AAA category of the 1980 Colgate Series.  It was the eighth edition of the tournament and was held from April 7 through April 13, 1980. First-seeded and defending champion Tracy Austin won the singles title and earned $30,000 first-prize money.

Finals

Singles
 Tracy Austin defeated  Regina Maršíková 3–6, 6–1, 6–0
 It was Austin's 6th title of the year and the 16th of her career.

Doubles
 Kathy Jordan /  Anne Smith defeated  Candy Reynolds /  Paula Smith 6–1, 6–1

Prize money and ranking points

Notes

References

External links
 Women's Tennis Association (WTA) tournament edition details
 International Tennis Federation (ITF) tournament edition details

Family Circle Cup
Family Circle Cup
Charleston Open
Family Circle Cup
Family Circle Cup